The Priest's Passion is a one scene chamber opera by Australian composer Matthew Dewey (born 1984), and was first produced by the IHOS Music Theatre Laboratory together with the Tasmanian Conservatorium of Music in September 2004. It premiered at the Stanley Burbury Theatre at the University of Tasmania in 2004 and was subsequently recorded by ABC Classic FM. The work, which explores the nature of religious angst is a symbolist opera.

Staging
The Priest's Passion was directed by Robert Jarman and Designed by Constantine Koukias

Original cast and creative team
Catholic Priest - Tenor (Adam Purton)
Woman – Soprano (Sarah Jones)
Angel - Soprano (Pamela Andrews)
Devil - Baritone (Tane Thomas)
Conductor – Jean Louis Forestier
Direction and Design - Robert Jarman
Musical Director - Matthew Dewey

References

External links
Matthew Dewey's web page
IHOS Music Theatre and Opera web page

Operas
Chamber operas
English-language operas
1990 operas
Opera in Australia